The Port Phillip District Wars is a name given to a series of violent encounters between European settlers and Aboriginal Australians in the Port Phillip District. They included the:
Convincing Ground massacre
Battle of Broken River
Campaspe Plains massacre
the Blood Hole massacre
the Gippsland massacres
Mount Cottrell massacre

References

History of Victoria (Australia)